Charles Griffin Gibson (November 21, 1899 – December 18, 1990) was a Major League baseball player for the Philadelphia Athletics.

Gibson was born in LaGrange, Georgia, and attended Alabama Polytechnic Institute.  He was head football coach at Auburn High School for the 1923 season, leading the team to a 6–0 record.  In 1924, he played his only season of Major League ball, participating in 12 games as a catcher for the Philadelphia Athletics.

References
 Charlie Gibson profile provided by baseball-reference.com
 Charlie Gibson profile provided by thebaseballcube.com

1899 births
1990 deaths
Major League Baseball catchers
Philadelphia Athletics players
Baseball players from Georgia (U.S. state)
Auburn High School (Alabama) people
Auburn Tigers baseball players
People from LaGrange, Georgia